John Robert Sutro (born May 8, 1940) is a former player in the National Football League. He played with the San Francisco 49ers during the 1962 NFL season.

References

1940 births
Living people
Players of American football from Oakland, California
American football offensive tackles
San Jose State Spartans football players
San Francisco 49ers players